Bemowo Piskie  is a village in the administrative district of Gmina Biała Piska, within Pisz County, Warmian-Masurian Voivodeship, in northern Poland. It is located in the historic region of Masuria.

The village has a population of 1,300.

History
The village was established in 1561, when Andrzej Szlaga founded an inn at the site. In the past the village was also known to the local Polish populace as Szlaga (after its founder) or Karczmisko (after the Polish word karczma, which means "inn"). From the 18th century it was part of the Kingdom of Prussia, and from 1871 to 1945 it was also part of Germany, administratively located in the province of East Prussia. After the defeat of Nazi Germany in World War II in 1945, the village along with Masuria became again part of Poland.

NATO Training Base 
Bemowo Piskie is the site of the NATO Enhanced Forward Presence battlegroup training base in Poland.

References

Villages in Pisz County
1560s establishments in Poland
Populated places established in 1561